Jacquinia pungens (syn. Jacquinia macrocarpa subsp. pungens) is a species of flowering plant in the family Primulaceae, native to southern Mexico. It is a shrub growing to 4 m tall, with lanceolate to oblong evergreen leaves 4–7 cm long, with a sharply pointed apex. The flowers are yellow, orange, or red, produced in tight racemes. The fruit is a yellow berry.

Images

Primulaceae
Flora of Mexico